Artur Görlitzer (sometimes Anglicized as Arthur Goerlitzer) (born June 22, 1893 in Frankfurt (Oder); † April 25, 1945 in Berlin) was a member of the German Reichstag and deputy Gauleiter of Berlin as a politician of the NSDAP.

Origin and occupation 
Artur Görlitzer's father was a railway official. Between 1899 and 1910 he first attended the seminar school in Neuzelle, then a community and a secondary school in Berlin. Until 1914 he worked as a civil servant and municipal official in the then independent Lankwitz. At the outbreak of World War I, he volunteered for war. Wounded three times during the war, he received the Iron Cross 1st and 2nd Class. In January 1917 promoted to lieutenant of the reserve, he was in May of the same year a French prisoner of war. There in 1919 he taught a military high school before he returned to Germany in 1920. In civilian life Görlitzer continued his career as a civil servant: first again employed in Lankwitz, he moved in 1921 after the incorporation of Lankwitz to the Berlin city administration. From September 1922 official of the Reichsfinanzverwaltung, he worked first at the tax office Steglitz, then at the Land Tax Office in Berlin, most recently as supreme tax secretary and chairman of the civil servants committee of the tax office Berlin – Friedrichstadt.

Member of the NSDAP 
Artur Görlitzer joined the NSDAP in 1928. According to his own statements, "In order to balance the attitude of the French and the English, every German must be radically national", and that "the solution of the Jewish question is the decisive problem of life for the German people".

In the NSDAP he took over 1928–1933 ever higher functions: initially an observer, he rose to the position of district leader. Because of his political activity he was relieved of office in 1930 in the Reichsfinanzverwaltung; a service criminal procedure initiated in November 1931 was discontinued in August 1932. From April 24, 1932 to October 14, 1933, he was a Prussian member of parliament.

Member of the Reichstag and deputy Gauleiter 

After the seizure of power of the Nazis Görlitzer became on March 13, 1933 deputy Gauleiter in Berlin, while the Gauleiter was Joseph Goebbels. On July 11, 1933 Görlitzer was appointed Prussian Council of State.  In the SA Görlitzer was promoted to SA Gruppenführer on November 9, 1938.

On July 20, 1934, Artur Görlitzer became councilor in Berlin, from 1941 he was the director and manager of the local  Deutschlandhalle AG and supervisory board member of the Deutsche Revisions und Treuhand AG auditing office.  On March 13, 1943, the diary of Joseph Goebbels refers to an anniversary celebration for Görlitzer, stating that he has been Goebbels' deputy for ten years.

From the beginning of 1944, Görlitzer joined the East Ministry under Reich Minister Alfred Rosenberg. In this function, he was briefly in the spring of 1944 General Commissioner of the General District Shitomir in the Reichskommissariat Ukraine. However, this office had no practical significance, as the area had already been reconquered by the Red Army.

Artur Görlitzer and his wife Paula committed suicide in Berlin on April 25, 1945. At that time, the city of Berlin was already surrounded by the Red Army. Their son Bruno had fallen at the beginning of 1943 at Stalingrad. Their daughter Anita emigrated to the US after the war.

Literature 

 Joachim Lilla (Editor):  extras in uniform. The members of the Reichstag 1933–1945.  Dusseldorf, Droste publishing house, 2004. .

References

External links 

 
 

Members of the Reichstag of Nazi Germany
Sturmabteilung officers
Nazi Party politicians
Nazi Party officials
1893 births
1945 suicides
Nazis who committed suicide in Germany
Joint suicides by Nazis